Astroloma foliosum, commonly known as candle cranberry, is a small shrub species in the family Ericaceae. It is endemic to the Perth region in Western Australia.

The species was formally described in 1845 by German botanist Otto Wilhelm Sonder based on plant material collected at Maddington.

References

foliosum
Ericales of Australia
Eudicots of Western Australia
Taxa named by Otto Wilhelm Sonder